Abdullah bin Mosaad bin Abdul Aziz Al Saud (born 19 February 1965) is the son of Prince Mosaad bin Abdul Aziz Al Saud. Prince Abdulla is a former general president of Saudi Arabia's General Sports Authority, a post held for about a thousand days between 26 of June 2014 and 22 of April 2017. The prince has various business interests, including paper manufacturing, in his homeland, along with various sporting franchises. He is the founder of United World Group, which holds the following entities: Sheffield United Football Club (FC), the Belgian Beerschot FC, Al-Hilal United FC in the UAE, La Berrichonne de Châteauroux in France, Kerala United FC in India, and other sports franchises.

Life and education
Prince Abdullah is a son of prince Mosaad bin Abdul Aziz Al Saud. His mother is Princess Fatima bint Hashim bin Turki Al Nijris hailing from the north-eastern Syrian city of Deir Al Zoar. Born in 1965 in Riyadh, prince Abdullah moved with his family to study in Beirut and returned to Riyadh at the age of ten.  After completing his high school studies, he joined King Saud University where he studied Industrial Engineering and received his bachelor's degree with honors with the highest distinction (Summa cum laude). Further study awarded him a master's degree in Industrial Engineering from King Saud University in Riyadh.

Business activities
In 1989 Prince Abdullah founded a paper manufacturing company in Saudi Arabia, the SPMC Group, along with some partners. The company expanded its operations to include paper recycling and other related paper ventures and became one of the largest companies in Middle East, with overseas interests. Prince Abdullah sold his interest in the company in 2016.

In the field of sport prince Abdullah was the chairman of the leading Saudi Arabian Al-Hilal FC for 18 months between 2002 and 2004 during which time the club won the Crown Prince Cup. During his brother's chairmanship of Al-Hilal, prince Abdulla supervised the club's investments. He remains supporter of the club.

In September 2013, prince Abdullah purchased a 50 percent stake in English then-EFL League One club Sheffield United and became co-chairman with Kevin McCabe. In February 2018, Prince Abdullah entered into negotiations with McCabe to take full control of Sheffield United. In September 2019 Prince Abdullah owned 100% of the club including all club-related properties (stadium, academy, hotel, etc.) after winning a legal case against his partner as per the High Court decision in UK.

Halfway in 2018, Prince Abdullah controlled 50% of the Belgian football club KFCO Beerschot Wilrijk in the Southern part of the city of Antwerp, and in January 2020 he increased his share in this club to 75%. The club was promoted to Belgian First Division A two years after Prince Abdullah taking over. It won the league final on the 2nd of August 2020. The club recently changed its name back to K Beerschot V Antwerp after the original name from the origin of the club. The club also acquired the historic registration number "13" again.  Around February 2020, it was announced that prince Abdullah took ownership of the newly established Al Hilal United FC in Dubai, UAE.  In October 2020, prince Abdullah became the owner of the newly formed Kerala United FC of I-League 2nd Division based in Calicut, India.

In March 2021, it was announced that he has ownership of La Berrichonne de Châteauroux of the National division based in Châteauroux, France.

Career 
In June 2014, Prince Abdullah was appointed General President of General Sports Authority in Saudi Arabia making him at the same time the head of the Saudi Arabian Olympic Committee, and the head of Islamic Solidarity Sports Federation. His tenure began on the 26 of June 2014 and ended on the 22 of April 2017. He was succeeded by Mohammed Abdul Malik Al Al-Sheikh. Later the Authority became a ministry.

The legacy of prince Abdullah as president of the General Sports Authority (GSA) is significant. Dozens of experts, commentators, TV and press interviews hailed the prince as the founder of modern Saudi sport  spearheading, amongst other endeavors, the privatisation of the major Saudi football clubs, the legalisation of the main sport bodies, the beginning of the mass participation in sport and exercise, and opening the doors for women to freely and legally join sport facilities.

Private life
Prince Abdullah married Princess Jawaher bint Fahd bint Abdullah Al Saud. He has five daughters and two sons.

He is known for his love of reading and American football. He is a fan of San Francisco 49ers. During the annual football season, he watches the games with friends every Sunday. He is also known for playing Fantasy Football. A chapter in the book ”Wasting Your Wildcard”: The Method and Madness of Fantasy Football by David Wardale, is about Prince Abdullah.

References

External links

Abdullah
Abdullah
Abdullah
Abdullah
1965 births
Al Hilal SFC presidents
Abdullah
King Saud University alumni
Living people
People from Riyadh
Saudi Arabian expatriates in England
Saudi Arabian people of Turkish descent
Saudi Arabian Sunni Muslims
Saudi Arabian writers
Sheffield United F.C. directors and chairmen